Rob McCoury is an American bluegrass musician who plays banjo.  He is the son of bluegrass musician Del McCoury, and is best known for his work with the Del McCoury Band and the Travelin' McCourys.

Biography
Rob McCoury was born in York County, Pennsylvania on April 30, 1971.

He was exposed to bluegrass from a young age, through his father's band, Del McCoury & The Dixie Pals.

At the age of 8 he started playing the banjo after seeing The Osborne Brothers play at Sunest Park in West Grove, PA.  In 1986 at the age of 15 he played bass with his Dad's band for the first time at a festival in Bath, NY. He would play as the bassist for his Dad's band for the next year and half when the banjo spot opened up and he made the switch to his preferred instrument.  His first show as a banjo player was in the spring of 1987 in Wilmington, DE at a benefit show for Ola Belle Reed, a singer/songwriter who penned one of his Dad's most requested songs, “High on the Mountain”, along with many others.  He has been with the band ever since.

McCoury graduated from Susquehannock High School in 1989, and in 2009 he and his brother Ronnie both won the High School's Distinguished Alumni Award.

He was named the 2015 International Bluegrass Music Association banjo player of the year in 2015.

Recordings
In 1995 Rob and his brother Ronnie released a self-titled CD on Rounder Records.  The album won the 1996 International Bluegrass Music Awards for Recorded Performance of the Year.

Personal life
Rob currently lives in Nashville, Tennessee, with his wife Lisa, and their three children.

Discography

Solo recordings
2014: The 5 String Flamethrower (Rounder)

With Ronnie McCoury
1995: Ronnie & Rob McCoury (Rounder)

References

American bluegrass musicians
1971 births
Living people
People from York County, Pennsylvania
Country musicians from Pennsylvania
The Travelin' McCourys members
Del McCoury Band members